Viktor Litschauer (1879 – 27 December 1939 in Innsbruck) was an Austrian mycologist.

From 1899 to 1903 he studied at the Vienna University of Technology, where he was a pupil and assistant to Franz Xaver Rudolf von Höhnel. For several years he served as a lecturer at the Vienna Gewerbemuseum, then from 1908 to 1936 he was a professor of natural history at the Innsbruck Handelsakademie (academy of commerce).

The mycological genera Litschauerella (Oberw., 1966) and Litschaueria (Petr., 1923) commemorate his name.

Bibliography 
 "Revision der Corticieen in Dr J. Schröter’s ‘Pilze Schlesiens’ nach seinen Herbarexemplaren". Annales Mycologici 4 (3): 288-294. (1906, with Franz Xaver Rudolf von Höhnel).
 "Beiträge zur Kenntnis der Corticeen". Sitzungsberichte der Kaiserlichen Akademie der Wissenschaften in Wien Mathematisch-Naturwissenschaftliche Classe, Abt. 1 115 (1): 1549-1620 [reprint pages 1–72], 10 figs. (1906, with Franz Xaver Rudolf von Höhnel).  
 "Beiträge zur Kenntnis der Corticeen (II. Mitteilung)". Sitzungsberichte der Kaiserlichen Akademie der Wissenschaften in Wien Mathematisch-Naturwissenschaftliche Classe, Abt. 1 116 (1): 739-852 [reprint pages 1–114] 20 figs, 4 plates. (1907, with Franz Xaver Rudolf von Höhnel).  
 "Beiträge zur Kenntnis der Corticeen (III Mitteilung)". Sitzungsberichte der Kaiserlichen Akademie der Wissenschaften in Wien Mathematisch-Naturwissenschaftliche Classe, Abt. 1 117: 1081-1124 [reprint pages 1–44], 10 figs. (1908, with Franz Xaver Rudolf von Höhnel).
 "Über eine neue Aleurodiscus-Art". Österreichische botanische Zeitschrift 75: 47-49, 1 fig. (1926). 
 "Über Corticium microsporum Karsten, sensu Bourdot et Galzin". Mitteil. Botan. Institut der Technischen Hochschule in Wien 4: 86-94, tab. 1. (1927). 
 "Über Stereum ambiquum Peck und Stereum sulcatum Burt. zwei neue Bürger der Hymenomycetenflora Europas". Archiv für Protistenkunde 72: 302-310, 1 fig., tab. 19. (1930)
 "Neue Corticieen aus Österreich". Österreichische botanische Zeitschrift 77 (2): 121-134. (1928).

References 

1879 births
1939 deaths
Austrian mycologists
TU Wien alumni